The following is a list of Sites of Special Scientific Interest in the Moray and Nairn Area of Search. For other areas, see List of SSSIs by Area of Search.

 Allt A'Choire
 Bochel Wood
 Boghole, Muckle Burn
 Buinach and Glenlatterach
 Burn of Ballintomb
 Cairngorms
 Carn nan Tri Tighearnan
 Cawdor Wood
 Clashach-Covesea
 Coleburn Pasture
 Creag Nan Gamhainn
 Culbin Sands, Forest and Findhorn Bay
 Cullen to Stakeness Coast
 Cutties Hillock
 Den of Pitlurg
 Dipple Brae
 Eastern Cairngorms
 Findhorn Terraces
 Findrassie
 Fodderletter
 Gull Nest
 Hill of Towanreef
 Inchrory
 Kellas Oakwood
 Kildrummie Kames
 Ladder Hills
 Lethenhill
 Loch Oire
 Loch Spynie
 Lossiemouth East Quarry
 Lossiemouth Shore
 Lower Findhorn Woods
 Lower River Spey
 Lower Strathavon Woods
 Masonshaugh
 Mill Wood
 Moidach More
 Moss of Crombie
 Muckle Burn, Clunas
 Northern Corries, Cairngorms
 Quarry Wood
 Randolph's Leap
 River Spey
 Scaat Craig
 Shiel Wood Pastures
 Spey Bay
 Spynie Quarry
 Teindland Quarry
 Tips of Corsemaul and Tom Mor
 Tynet Burn
 Whiteness Head

 
Moray and Nairn